Warmiany  is a village in the administrative district of Gmina Bisztynek, within Bartoszyce County, Warmian-Masurian Voivodeship, in northern Poland.

With the Second Peace of Thorn in 1466, the area became part of the Kingdom of Poland until 1772; 1772-1945 Kingdom of Prussia and Germany (East Prussia). 

When it was part of Germany, the village was known as Schönwalde.

References

Warmiany